Hon. Ursula Owusu-Ekuful (born 20 October 1964) hails from Akim Oda in the Eastern Region of Ghana. She is a lawyer, women's rights activist and a Ghanaian parliamentarian representing Ablekuma West constituency. She is currently the Minister of Communications and Digitalisation.

Early life and education
Ursula hails from Akim Oda in the Eastern Region of Ghana. She attended Labone Senior High School and proceeded to Mfantisman Girls Secondary School for sixth form education. She continued to the University of Ghana and the Ghana School Of Law, where she obtained an LLB. She was called to the bar in 1990. She obtained a master's degree in Conflict, Peace and Security from the Kofi Annan International Peacekeeping Training Centre.

Pre-political career 
She worked for ten years as a lawyer at Akufo-Addo, Prempeh & Co. law firm before moving into the telecommunication industry to lead a telecom, technology company.  
 
Ursula, in her professional career has served on different boards and in different capacities.

 Managing Consultant with N. U. Consult Legal, Governance and Gender Consultants,
 Executive Member of International Federation of Women Lawyers (FIDA), Ghana,
 Former President of FIDA Ghana
 Former Vice President of the Africa Regional FIDA International.
 Member of the Ghana Bar Association,
 Member of the African Women Lawyers Association (AWLA)
 Acting Managing Director of Western Telesystems (Westel) (September 2005 to May 2008) , and 
 Corporate and External Affairs Director, ZAIN Ghana (April 2008 to January 2009).

Politics 
In 2012, she was elected to be the Member of Parliament for the new constituency Ablekuma West Constituency as their first member of parliament.

In 2015, she contested and won the NPP parliamentary primaries in the Ablekuma West Constituency. She retained her parliamentary seat during the 2016 Ghanaian general elections by winning with 34,376 votes out of the 60,558 valid votes cast making 56.96%.  She and other female MPs were subject to personal attacks after there was a dispute over places reserved for female members of parliament. She was reported as saying that she was considering her future in politics, but the following year she became the Minister of Communications.

In 2017, she was appointed as the Minister to head the Ministry for Communications by President Akufo-Addo. She is currently the Minister for Communications and Digitalization.

in December 2020, she contested for re-election as member of parliament in the 2020 Ghanaian general election as the parliamentary candidate for the NPP. Going into the election as the incumbent Member of Parliament of the Ablekuma West Constituency, she retained her seat after polling 37,363 out of 69,353 votes. Her closest competitor Rev. Kweku Addo of the National Democratic Congress (NDC) was second with 30,733 votes, whilst the other candidates who contested from the other parties, GUM, LPG and PNC polled 359, 330 and 65, respectively.

Committees 
She is currently serving on the following Parliamentary committees:

Constitutional, Legal and Parliamentary Affairs Committee (7th Parliament)

Appointments Committee (7th Parliament)

SOCIO-POLITICS

In 2015 she and other women MPs were subject to personal attacks after there was a dispute over places reserved for women members of parliament. She was reported as saying that she was considering her future in politics, but the following year she became the Minister of Communications. Before her current position as the Minister of Communication, she served on different boards and in different capacities in her professional career.

In April 2018 she suffered a backlash from a section of the Ghanaian community when she made headlines for sharing a post on social media that suggested Ghanaian Muslims were intolerant. On Saturday, the 29th day of September 2018, She was installed as the Nkosuohemaa (Development Queen) by the traditional leaders and the people of Akem Asuom in the Eastern Region of Ghana. The instalment took place at the Palace of Asuomhene Osabarima Ofosuhene Apenteng II.

In 2021, when the Ghanaian anti-LGBT bill was proposed, she criticised components of the bill as incentives to promote laziness and dishonesty so the bill will have to be revised. She also in May 2021, advised LGBT+ individuals in Ghana to keep their activities private as Ghanaians were unable to accept same-sex relations.

Personal 
She is married with one child to a UK-based Ghanaian optometrist, Dr Sam Ekuful. She identifies as a Christian.

Honours 
On Saturday, 29 September 2018, she was  installed as  the Nkosuohemaa (Development Queen) by the traditional leaders and the people of Akyem Asuom in the Kwaebibirem District of the Eastern Region of Ghana. The ceremony took place at the Palace of Asuomhene Osabarima Ofosuhene Apenteng II.

In February 2019 she was honoured by the International Federation of Women Lawyers (FIDA) in recognition of her work in the protection of the rights of women and children at the 2019 FIDA Africa Regional Congress held in Abuja, Nigeria.

References

1964 births
Living people
People from Eastern Region (Ghana)
New Patriotic Party politicians
Ghanaian MPs 2013–2017
Ghanaian MPs 2017–2021
21st-century Ghanaian women politicians
University of Ghana alumni
Ghana School of Law alumni
Mfantsiman Girls' Secondary School alumni
Women members of the Parliament of Ghana
Ghanaian MPs 2021–2025